Me & Bobby Fischer is a documentary about Bobby Fischer's last years as his old friend Saemundur Palsson gets him out of jail in Japan and helps him settle in Iceland.

The film premiered at the Green Light Films’ Bíódagar film festival in April 2009.

Cast
 Bobby Fischer
 Saemundur Palsson
 Kári Stefánsson

Festivals
 Green Light Reykjavik

See also
 List of books and documentaries by or about Bobby Fischer

References 

2009 films
Works about Bobby Fischer
Icelandic documentary films
2009 documentary films
Films about chess
Chess in Iceland
2009 in chess
2000s English-language films